The 1984 Milan Indoor was a men's tennis tournament played on indoor carpet courts at the Palazzo dello Sport in Milan, Italy that was part of the 1984 Volvo Grand Prix. It was the seventh edition of the tournament and was held from 19 March until 25 March 1984. Unseeded Stefan Edberg won the singles title.

Finals

Singles
 Stefan Edberg defeated  Mats Wilander 6–4, 6–2
 It was Edberg's first singles title of his career.

Doubles
 Tomáš Šmíd /  Pavel Složil defeated  Kevin Curren /  Steve Denton 6–4, 6–3,

References

External links
 ITF tournament edition details

Milan
Cuore Cup
Cuore Cup
Milan Indoor